The uninhabited Saneruarsuk Islands are members of the Arctic Archipelago in the territory of Nunavut. They are irregularly shaped, Baffin Island offshore islands, located in the Admiralty Inlet. Yeoman Island lies to their northwest.

External links 
 Saneruarsuk Islands in the Atlas of Canada - Toporama; Natural Resources Canada

Archipelagoes of Baffin Island
Uninhabited islands of Qikiqtaaluk Region
Archipelagoes of the Canadian Arctic Archipelago